Bath School is a historic school complex located at Bath, Beaufort County, North Carolina.  It was built in phases between 1918 and 1966, and consists of two classroom buildings and a classroom and auditorium building connected by a two-story hyphen. Each section is a two-story, brick structure with a hipped roof and Colonial Revival style design details.  A kitchen addition was built in 1966.  Also on the property are the contributing 1 1/2-story vocational building constructed in 1939 with funds from the Public Works Administration (PWA), one-story shop building built in 1948, and flagpole.

It was listed on the National Register of Historic Places in 2008. It is located in the Bath Historic District.

References

Public Works Administration in North Carolina
School buildings on the National Register of Historic Places in North Carolina
Colonial Revival architecture in North Carolina
School buildings completed in 1918
Schools in Beaufort County, North Carolina
National Register of Historic Places in Beaufort County, North Carolina
Historic district contributing properties in North Carolina
1918 establishments in North Carolina